Miloš Roman (born 6 November 1999) is a Slovak professional ice hockey player who currently for HC Oceláři Třinec of the Czech Extraliga.

Career statistics

Regular season and playoffs

International

Awards and honors

References

External links

 

1999 births
Living people
HC Frýdek-Místek players
HC Oceláři Třinec players
Vancouver Giants players
Slovak ice hockey centres
Ice hockey players at the 2022 Winter Olympics
Olympic ice hockey players of Slovakia
Medalists at the 2022 Winter Olympics
Olympic bronze medalists for Slovakia
Olympic medalists in ice hockey
Slovak expatriate ice hockey players in the Czech Republic
Slovak expatriate ice hockey players in Canada